USS Mahanna (AG-8) was a Mahanna-class cargo ship. She was acquired by the U.S. Navy as a miscellaneous auxiliary cargo vessel, to be used for transporting general stores to Navy units in the field.

Mahanna was a wooden steam freighter, which was built by McEachern & Co., Astoria, Oregon, in 1919. She was operated by the U.S. Shipping Board (USSB), transferred to the Navy at Norfolk, Virginia, on 20 September 1920, and then commissioned at Norfolk on 29 September 1920.

Service with the Atlantic Fleet 
 
Mahanna was assigned to the U.S. Atlantic Fleet. She sailed out of Norfolk for survey missions to the West Indies during the next year, cruising between the Caribbean and the U.S. East Coast ports with other survey ships.

Decommissioning 

She was decommissioned at Portsmouth, New Hampshire, on 15 September 1921. Mahanna was returned to the United States Shipping Board (USSB) on 2 December 1921 and struck from the Navy list.

References

External links 
 Dictionary of American Naval Fighting Ships
 NavSource Online: Service Ship Photo Archive - AG-8 Mahanna

Ships built in Astoria, Oregon
1919 ships
Cargo ships of the United States Navy